

This page lists board and card games, wargames, miniatures games, and tabletop role-playing games published in 1984.  For video games, see 1984 in video gaming.

Games released or invented in 1984

Game awards given in 1984
 Spiel des Jahres: Railway Rivals (German title is Dampfross)

Significant games-related events in 1984
Hasbro purchases the Milton Bradley Company.

See also
 1984 in video gaming

Games
Games by year